Phan Văn Giang (born October 1960) is a Vietnamese General, politician and Vietnam's Minister of National Defence.

Phan Văn Giang was born in 1960 in Thái Nguyên Province, joined the Central Committee of the Communist Party of Vietnam in 2016.

Other positions held included:
 Deputy Commander and Chief of Staff of The 312th Division, The 1st Corps (Vietnam People's Army) (2000 - 2003).
 Commander of the 312th Division, The 1st Corps (Vietnam People's Army) (2003 - 2008).
 Deputy Commander and Chief of Staff of The 1st Corps (Vietnam People's Army) (2008 - 2010)
 Commander of the 1st Corps (Vietnam People's Army) (2010 - 2011)
 Deputy Chief of General Staff (2011–14)
 Commander of 1st Military Region (Vietnam People's Army) (2014 - 2016)
 Chief of the General Staff (2016-2021)

Rank
Phan Văn Giang was promoted to Major General (:fr:Général de brigade) in 2009, then to Lieutenant General (:fr:Général de division) in 2013, after that Colonel General (:fr:Général de corps d'armée) in 2017, Army General in 2021.

References

1960 births
Generals of the People's Army of Vietnam
Living people
People from Thái Nguyên province
Members of the 13th Politburo of the Communist Party of Vietnam
Members of the 12th Central Committee of the Communist Party of Vietnam
Members of the 13th Central Committee of the Communist Party of Vietnam